Mikhail Valeryevich Gremyatskiy (born 9 January 1968) is a retired Russian professional footballer.

He played for the FC Lokomotiv Moscow in the USSR Federation Cup.

External links

1968 births
Living people
Soviet footballers
Russian footballers
Russian Premier League players
Russian expatriate footballers
Expatriate footballers in Sweden
FC Lokomotiv Moscow players
FC Spartak Vladikavkaz players
FC Asmaral Moscow players
FC Irtysh Omsk players
FC Kristall Smolensk players
Association football defenders
FC FShM Torpedo Moscow players
FC Znamya Truda Orekhovo-Zuyevo players